Ösökhbayaryn Chagnaadorj (born ) is a Mongolian male weightlifter, competing in the 56 kg category and representing Mongolia at international competitions. He participated at the 2016 Summer Olympics in the men's 56 kg event. After his performance he had an IOC out-of-competition test and tested positive on exogenous testosterone.

He competed at world championships, including at the 2015 World Weightlifting Championships.

Major results

References

External links
 

1997 births
Living people
Mongolian male weightlifters
Place of birth missing (living people)
Weightlifters at the 2016 Summer Olympics
Olympic weightlifters of Mongolia
Doping cases in weightlifting
20th-century Mongolian people
21st-century Mongolian people